Rolls-Royce Submarines, a subsidiary of Rolls-Royce plc, operates three sites licensed to handle nuclear material, two of which are at Raynesway in Derby, and the other at Vulcan Nuclear Reactor Testing Establishment (NRTE), Dounreay, UK.

The Manufacturing Site was licensed in August 1960 and deals with processing of uranium fuel and the fabrication of Rolls-Royce PWR nuclear reactor cores for Royal Navy submarines such as the new .

The Neptune/Radioactive Components Facility Site was licensed in November 1961 and houses the Neptune test reactor which is used to conduct experiments on reactor cores.

It was created as a joint company in 1954 with the name Rolls-Royce and Associates; the associates being Vickers, Foster Wheeler and later Babcock & Wilcox.  It changed its name on 15 January 1999 to Rolls-Royce Marine Power Operations Limited and is part of the marine business of Rolls-Royce plc. It changed its name again on 1 August 2018 to Rolls-Royce Submarines Limited.

References

External links

HSE Nuclear Safety Review
Rolls-Royce History Lecture (pdf)
Scottish CND article about Raynesway nuclear safety
Bird's Eye aerial photo of Raynesway's Neptune reactor test facility on UK Secret Bases website

Companies based in Derby
Marine engine manufacturers
Nuclear technology in the United Kingdom
Rolls-Royce